Kiên Lương is a rural district (huyện) of Kiên Giang province in the Mekong Delta region of Vietnam.

Divisions
The district is subdivided to 8 commune-level subdivisions, including Kiên Lương township and the rural communes of: Bình An, Bình Trị, Dương Hoà, Hoà Điền, Kiên Bình, Hòn Nghệ and Sơn Hải.

As of 2003 the district had a population of 93,905. The district covers an area of 906 km2. The district capital lies at Kiên Lương.

See also
 Bà Lụa Islands

References

Districts of Kiên Giang province